Yoon Ha Lee (born January 26, 1979 in Houston, Texas) is an American science fiction and fantasy writer, known for his Machineries of Empire space opera novels and his short fiction. His first novel, Ninefox Gambit, received the 2017 Locus Award for Best First Novel.

Life
When he was young, Lee's Korean American family lived in both Texas and South Korea, where he attended high school at Seoul Foreign School, an English-language international school. He went to college at Cornell University, majoring in mathematics, and earned a master's degree in secondary mathematics education at Stanford University. He has worked as an analyst for an energy market intelligence company, done web design, and taught mathematics.

Lee is a trans man and describes himself as queer. He lives in Louisiana with his husband and daughter. Lee has aphantasia and bipolar disorder and was diagnosed with autism as an adult.

Career
Since his first sale in 1999, Lee has published short fiction in The Magazine of Fantasy & Science Fiction, Clarkesworld, Lightspeed magazine and elsewhere. Three of his stories have been reprinted in Gardner Dozois's The Year's Best Science Fiction anthologies. Dozois wrote that Lee is "one of those helping to move science fiction into the twenty-first century".

In 2012, Lee wrote Winterstrike, a browser-based text adventure game, for Failbetter Games.

Aliette de Bodard wrote the introduction for Conservation of Shadows and has twice recommended one of Lee's stories in her best of year round-ups: she selected "Ghostweight" as a favorite of 2011 and "The Knight of Chains, the Deuce of Stars" was chosen in her 2013 eligibility and recommendations post as "the one that most blew me away this year". "Flower, Mercy, Needle, Chain" and "Ghostweight" were both nominated for the Theodore Sturgeon Memorial Award and Locus Award and were both reprinted in two "Year's Best" anthologies. "The Pirate Captain's Daughter" was nominated for the WSFA Small Press Award.

His debut novel, Ninefox Gambit, received the 2017 Locus Award for Best First Novel. It was also nominated for the 2016  Nebula and Hugo Awards for Best Novel and the 2017 Clarke award. Revenant Gun, the third novel in the Machineries of Empire series, was nominated for a 2019 Hugo Award.

Dragon Pearl, the first book of the middle grade Thousand Worlds series, was released on January 15, 2019, published by Disney Hyperion under the "Rick Riordan Presents" publishing imprint. Dragon Pearl won the 2020 Locus Award for Best Young Adult Book and the 2020 Mythopoeic Fantasy Award for Children's Literature. It was a finalist for the 2020 Lodestar Award for Best Young Adult Book and the 2019 Andre Norton Award.

Lee announced on his website that a third book in the middle grade Thousand Worlds series and Lancers, a new young adult space opera series, are forthcoming.

Bibliography

Novels
Machineries of Empire trilogy

Thousand Worlds series (middle grade)

Standalone novels

Collections

Short stories 
Machineries of Empire stories

Other short fiction

References

External links
 

Interview at Clarkesworld, May 2013
Review of Conservation of Shadows  at Strange Horizons
Review of Ninefox Gambit by N.K. Jemisin  at NY Times
Short stories available free online

1979 births
Living people
American science fiction writers
American short story writers
American writers of Korean descent
Cornell University alumni
American LGBT people of Asian descent
LGBT people from Texas
The Magazine of Fantasy & Science Fiction people
Stanford University alumni
Transgender men
Queer men
Queer writers
Interactive fiction writers
American transgender writers
People on the autism spectrum
People with bipolar disorder